Thirbam Malla (1925–1950) was a Nepalese democracy activist.

Biography 
Thirbam Malla was born in 1925 in Nepal. He grew up in a privileged family and he studied at a military school in Dehradun.

In 1950, the Nepali Congress launched a countrywide revolution to remove the power of the Rana dynasty. Malla had master-planned to capture the city of Birgunj and the fort alongside obtaining arms and the treasury. On 10 November 1950, they managed to capture Badahakim (governor), his guards, and their weapons without any casualties. When he was talking about "peace and order" to the guards, a Rana officer shot him and fled. Malla was taken to hospital in Raxaul where he later died on 11 November. 

After his death, he has received martyrdom. In 2000, the Government of Nepal issued a stamp featuring Thirbam Malla.

References

Further reading 

 
 

1925 births
1950 deaths
Nepalese democracy activists
Nepalese military personnel killed in action
Nepalese martyrs